The Ajmer Legislative Assembly was the Vidhan Sabha (Legislative Assembly) of Ajmer State, India.

As Ajmer State was included in the Constitution of India as a class 'C' state, a legislative assembly was formed in May 1952, constituted by the winners of the 1952 Ajmer Legislative Assembly election. The assembly had 30 members, 12 elected from double-member constituencies and 18 elected from single-member constituencies.

Following the 1952 election, the Ajmer Legislative Assembly had 20 members from the Indian National Congress, 3 from the Bharatiya Jan Sangh, 3 from Pursharathi Panchayat and 4 independents. Five by-elections were held in Jethana (March 1953, following the death of incumbent legislator Narayan), Bhinai (September 1953, as nomination papers had been improperly rejected), Gagwana (by-elections held twice, first in September 1953 as nomination paper had been improperly rejected, then again as the election had been rejected due to office of profit issue) and Nayanagar (September 1953, as nomination papers had been improperly rejected).

As of 1954 Chowdhury Bhagirath Singh was the Speaker of the Ajmer Legislative Assembly. As of 1956 Ramesh Chandra Bhargava was the speaker of the Ajmer Legislative Assembly, and  Syed Abbas Ali the Deputy Speaker. Committees of the Ajmer Legislative Assembly included Estimates Committee, the Public Accounts Committee, the Privilege Committee, the Assurance Committee and the Petition Committee.

The Ajmer Legislative Assembly held a session 4–6 April 1956, to discuss the States Reorganisation Act and approved the merger of the state into Rajasthan. As Ajmer State was merged into Rajasthan in 1956, the erstwhile Ajmer Legislative Assembly members were included in the Rajasthan Legislative Assembly until the end of the term of the assembly.

References

 
Historical state legislatures in India
History of Ajmer